Outlaws 'til the End, Vol. 1 is the eighth studio album by American heavy metal band DevilDriver. It was released on July 6, 2018, via Napalm Records. 

On February 28, 2017, DevilDriver announced via their Instagram account that they are to release an outlaw country covers record, with 13 tracks currently in production, with over 15 "high caliber" guests contributing. On July 15, frontman Dez Fafara announced that the number of guests had risen to 20–25, and that these included artists such as Lamb of God's Randy Blythe and Mark Morton, Lee Ving from FEAR, Glenn Danzig, Testament's Chuck Billy, and John 5. In the same interview, Fafara revealed that some of the artists that would be covered on the album are Willie Nelson, Johnny Cash, Waylon Jennings, and Johnny Paycheck, with Steve Evetts as album producer.

Track listing 
All music performed by DevilDriver, except where noted.

Personnel 
DevilDriver
 Dez Fafara – vocals
 Mike Spreitzer – lead guitar, bass
 Neal Tiemann – rhythm guitar, bass
 Austin D'Amond – drums

Additional personnel
 Steve Evetts – production
 Hank Williams III – vocals
 Randy Blythe – vocals
 Mark Morton – vocals
 John Carter Cash – vocals
 Ana Cristina – vocals
 Wednesday 13 – vocals
 Lee Ving – vocals
 Brock Lindow – vocals
 Burton C. Bell – vocals

Charts

References 

2018 albums
DevilDriver albums
Napalm Records albums
Albums produced by Steve Evetts
Covers albums